Hum na Sutli is a municipality in the Krapina-Zagorje County of Croatia. According to the 2011 census, there are 5,060 inhabitants in the municipality, the absolute majority of which are Croats.

References

Populated places in Krapina-Zagorje County
Municipalities of Croatia